Ralph Robert Shaw (May 18, 1907 – October 14, 1972) was a librarian, a publisher, and an innovator in library science.  In 1999, American Libraries named him one of the "100 Most Important Leaders We Had in the 20th Century".

Scarecrow Press 
Ralph Shaw founded a publishing company called the Scarecrow Press in 1950 in the basement of his Alexandria, Virginia home, “assisted only by his wife Viola”.   Shaw wanted to establish a publishing company that would publish scholarly and academic work, unlikely to capture the attention from most companies that were more concerned with making money than the distribution of scholarly ideas. He started the Scarecrow Press with “author and editor Earl Schenk Miers”. The website for the company describes how the company name came out of this idea that this new company was not concerned with making money.  “Shaw knew that costs would have to be kept in control because he envisioned publishing scholarly books that were intellectually important, yet economically marginal. As Shaw described a company that would avoid excessive office costs, excessive editorial costs, general trade advertising, and the building up a staff, Miers broke in, saying, "You're talking about a scarecrow: it has no overhead, it pays no rent, it is not responsible for anybody's future clothing and shelter. It's a scarecrow!"

Kenneth F. Kister, in his biography of Eric Moon describes as  “dynamic…a polymath who had more irons in the fire than any librarian since Melvil Dewey”.  And Moon himself, considered a “radical” in the library world, had once warned a researcher that “interviewing Ralph Shaw in the morning was like having “six martinis for breakfast”.   Eventually, Moon replaced Shaw as chief editor of Scarecrow press as he faced his battle with cancer and treatment and they had conflicts in the interim. Scarecrow was sold to Grolier in 1969. The company still publishes for the academic community. It “was purchased in 1995 by University Press of America and moved from its Metuchen, New Jersey, headquarters to Lanham, Maryland, where it is now a member of the  Rowman & Littlefield Publishing Group".

Career and education 
Ralph Shaw had is first job in a library at the age of 16 when he worked as a page at the Cleveland Public Library. He obtained his BA in 1928 from the Adelbert College Western Reserve University and then subsequently a library science bachelor's degree from the library school at Columbia University in 1929.  He then went on to obtain his master's degree from the library school at Columbia University in 1931 and his PhD from the University of Chicago in 1950.  By the time  Shaw had earned his PhD he had already served as senior assistant and chief bibliographer of the Engineering Society's Library, served as the  director of the Gary Public Library in Indiana, and had been appointed the director of the U.S. National Agricultural Library in 1940.

United States National Agricultural Library - (1940–1954)

Shaw served as the department librarian for the United States National Agricultural Library (NAL) from 1940 to 1954. Shaw's personal project was to mechanize the bibliography and citation process of the Agricultural Library, creating more efficient means of searching and referencing information.

Rutgers University  - Faculty 1954, Dean 1959-1961

In his role as Rutgers faculty Shaw worked on the second revision of American Bibliography, working with Richard H. Shoemaker to complete its entries through the year 1846.

University of Hawaii – 1964–1969

Shaw was the Dean of Library Activities 1966 to 1969 at the Hamilton Library at the University of Hawaii at Manoa.

Innovations and inventions 
Ralph Shaw was said to have been “anti-machine” when it came to libraries. But through the administrative advances and use of technology, Shaw “adapted and invented machines to do library work” because “by completing routine tasks of librarianship more efficiently, machines could enable professional librarians to devote more time to the intellectual aspects of their work”. Shaw's work with machines also led him to pioneer discussions of conflicts within Library Science spurred by technology. As a dedicated bibliographer, Shaw noted that bibliography traditionally focused upon the physical aspects of an item or on its method of production. Show noted however that as Library Science progressed bibliography placed increasing emphasis upon the intellectual content of a work, which required different conceptual frames to process and eventually would require different organizational methods.

Bookmobile 

While he was the director at the Gary Public Library in Indiana, Shaw “purchased small house trailers, redesigned their interiors, and transported them with a single truck cab to specified stations throughout Gary on a regular schedule”. This version of the bookmobile saved more money than the “door-to-door deliveries” version that was in place previously.

Transaction card charging 

Also, while at the library in Gary, Shaw improved the process by which libraries tracked books that were over due. It used to be that many librarians, when books were returned, were having to look through cards, to find the date due and identify late returns. Transaction cards were placed in books and were “numbered in serial order” by date so when books were returned, any missing books prompted a late notice.

Photo-Clerk 

The Photo-Clerk was used in the transaction card charging system to make copies of the due date cards.   Shaw also experimented with the Photo-Clerk at the Department of Agriculture Library.

Rapid selector 

The rapid selector was a device used to quickly search microfilm. Vannevar Bush  had developed the “microfilm storage and information retrieval device that he expanded - in theory, anyway - with his plans for the 'Memex' machine, a futuristic device that foreshadowed the modern computer and hypertext linking”. “With Dr. Bush's permission, Ralph used his concepts to develop a more effective and commercially viable machine”, however, “nothing ever came of the Rapid Selector”.

Personal life

He married his first wife Viola Susan Leff in 1929 and married his second wife, Mary McChesney Andrews in 1969.

Footnotes

Additional references 
 Hines, Theodore C. "Shaw and The Machine." Essays For Ralph Shaw. Ed. Norman D.Stevens. Metuchen, NJ: The Scarecrow Press, 1975.
 Kent, Allen, Harold Lancour, and Jay Elwood Daily. "Shaw, Ralph Robert." Encyclopedia of Library and Information Science:. 27. CRC Press, 1979
 Martin, Lowell. "A Tribute To Ralph Shaw." Essays For Ralph Shaw. Ed. Norman D. Stevens. Metuchen, NJ: The Scarecrow Press, 1975.

External links

 

Library science scholars
American librarians
American publishers (people)
1907 births
1972 deaths
Presidents of the American Library Association
Case Western Reserve University alumni
University of Chicago Graduate Library School alumni
Columbia University School of Library Service alumni
United States Department of Agriculture officials
United States National Agricultural Library
Rutgers University faculty
University of Hawaiʻi faculty
Businesspeople from Detroit
20th-century American businesspeople